Waltham Holy Cross was an urban district in the county of Essex, England, which was abolished and amalgamated with other local government districts in 1974 to form the Epping Forest District. The district consisted of the area of the ancient parish of Waltham Holy Cross.

A suburb of London, the district was within the conurbation, the Metropolitan Police District, the London postal district, the London Transport area, and London Traffic Area, forming part of the review area of the Royal Commission on Local Government in Greater London. It did not, however, become part of the proposed Greater London area in 1965.

Following the formation of the Epping Forest District in 1974, it was re-established as a civil parish, named Waltham Abbey.

History
The large ancient parish of Waltham Holy Cross adopted the Public Health Act 1848 and the Waltham Holy Cross Local Board of Health was formed in 1850. The district was bounded on the west by the River Lea and contained a large part of Epping Forest.

The local government district became an urban district in 1894.

The district was within the Metropolitan Police District and part of the review area of the Royal Commission on Local Government in Greater London, however it did not form part of the proposed Greater London area, because it was entirely within the Metropolitan Green Belt and had limited connection to the London built-up area. The urban district was abolished by the Local Government Act 1972 on 1 April 1974, becoming part of the non-metropolitan district of Epping Forest. A successor parish was formed at the same time. By resolution of the parish council, the parish was redesignated as Waltham Abbey with the status of a town, and accordingly is now governed by Waltham Abbey Town Council with its headquarters at Waltham Abbey Town Hall.

Coat of arms
The urban district council was granted a coat of arms on 9 November 1956. The black engrailed cross and four gold cross crosslets on a silver ground come from the arms of Waltham Abbey and the lion's face is from the attributed arms of King Harold Godwinson. The crest above the arms featured a stag for Epping Forest. In the stag's mouth was a seaxe, or distinctive notched sword, from the arms of Essex County Council. A heraldic fountain on the stag's shoulder represented the King George V Reservoir. The colours of the torse wreath and mantling were red and white: the livery colours of both Essex County Council and the City of London Corporation, custodians of Epping Forest. The coat of arms of the urban district council were transferred to Waltham Abbey Town Council by Order in Council in 1974.

References

Political history of Essex
Epping Forest District
Districts of England created by the Local Government Act 1894
Districts of England abolished by the Local Government Act 1972
Urban districts of England
Waltham Abbey